The 2015 CIS Women's Ice Hockey Championship was held from March 12–15, 2015, in Calgary, Alberta, to determine a national champion for the 2014–15 CIS women's ice hockey season. The entire tournament was played at the Markin MacPhail Centre near the campus of the University of Calgary. The Western Mustangs defeated the McGill Martlets in a 5-0 shutout win to capture their first national championship. Anthea Lasis, Ally Galloway, Stacey Scott, Kendra Broad and Casey Rosen scored for the Mustangs. Goaltender Kelly Campbell recorded 38 saves in the win, gaining recognition as the Tournament MVP.

Participating teams

Championship Bracket

Awards and honours
Championship MVP: Kelly Campbell, Western

Player of the Game

All-Tournament Team
Goaltender: Kelly Campbell, Western
Defenceman: Katelyn Gosling, Western
Defenceman: Kelsie Moffatt, McGill
Forward: Kendra Broad, Western
Forward: Gabrielle Davidson, McGIll
Forward: Alex Normore, St. FX

References

External links 
 Championship Website

2014–15 in Canadian ice hockey
U Sports women's ice hockey
Ice hockey in Alberta
University of Calgary
Western Mustangs